The Setia Jaya Station is a connected station located nearby Bandar Sunway and served by the  KTM Port Klang Line and  BRT Sunway Line. However, the BRT section of the station is called Sunway-Setia Jaya.

The stop is located on the junction of Federal Highway and Damansara–Puchong Expressway and within walking distance of factories in the free industrial zone. Leisure Commerce Square & Mentari Court Apartment is just behind the station. A major landmark near station would be the Freescale LDP Bridge at Damansara–Puchong Expressway.

There is no "paid area to paid area" link-up between the Port Klang Line and BRT Sunway Line and users have to exit the paid area of one system and enter the paid area of the other when transferring.

The  passes through, but does not stop at this station. Skypark Link trains stop at the adjacent  station instead.

Name
The station was known as Sungai Way Station in the 1980s. while the new name “Setia Jaya” originate from Seri Setia (Sungai Way) new village, and “Jaya” means victory in Malay language and also from Petaling Jaya.

Gallery

References

External links
 Setia Jaya KTM Komuter Station

Railway stations in Selangor
Railway stations opened in 1995
Rapid transit stations in Selangor
Port Klang Line
Bus rapid transit in Malaysia
1995 establishments in Malaysia